The Vancouver Island fixed link is any of various proposals to construct a fixed link by bridges, tunnels, and/or causeways across the Strait of Georgia, which connects Vancouver Island to the Lower Mainland of British Columbia. The strait has a minimum width of 19.4 km (12.05 mi) between Galiano Island and Tsawwassen Ferry Terminal.

History
The idea of constructing a fixed link has existed since the late 1800s.

Public support for a fixed link resurfaced following a strike by employees of CP Steamships and the Black Ball Line in 1958 and the subsequent establishment of BC Ferries in 1960. Support again resurfaced after a controversial fare hikes in 1976. This led to a variety of studies to be published examining the feasibility of constructing a fixed link.

A series of controversial fare hikes during the financial crisis of 2007–2008 again stoked calls for a fixed link.

Feasibility
Various studies were conducted throughout the 1980s and the 1990s to assess the feasibility of constructing a fixed link between Vancouver Island and the Lower Mainland across the strait. Proposals varied greatly in length and used one or more of the northern Gulf Islands as an anchorage point. Fixed link designs have included a bored tunnel, a submerged floating tunnel, a floating bridge, or a cable-stayed bridge.

Challenges to establishing a fixed link include the presence of large cargo ships in the area; the depth of the Georgia Strait (up to 365 m deep); the depth of soft sediments found on the ocean bed (up to 450 m thick); potential marine slope instabilities along the eastern side of the strait; extreme wave conditions (4-7 m waves, with 6 m tides and 2-knot current), extreme wind speeds (up to 115 km/h, with gusts up to 180 km/h); seasonal fog, snow, and ice accumulation on the structure; and the high seismic activity of the region. No fixed bridges or tunnels exist in the world that meet those challenging conditions.

Criticisms
Supporters see a fixed-link as an opportunity to boost tourism and stimulate economic growth on the Vancouver Island. Depending on the specific alignment, a fixed-link would shorten travel times by replacing one or more of BC Ferries' routes between the island and Lower Mainland. Former B.C. cabinet minister Dr. Patrick McGeer (1927-2022) was an outspoken supporter of a fixed link.

Opponents argue that improving the speed and reliability of BC Ferries service across the strait would eliminate the need for a fixed link. There are also concerns that the construction of a fixed link will result in further urbanization of the island and that the area's environment will be negatively affected by construction and increased tourism. The idea of a fixed link has formal opposition in the form of an Islands Trust policy banning the building of any bridges or tunnels connecting the Gulf Islands to the Lower Mainland or Vancouver Island.

See also
Long Island Sound link
Newfoundland–Labrador fixed link
Strait of Gibraltar crossing

References

Transport in British Columbia
Proposed undersea tunnels in North America
Proposed transport infrastructure in Canada